Paul Michael Barry is a British songwriter and musician.  Some of his best-known songs he has co-written include "Believe" by Cher, "Hero" and "Bailamos" by Enrique Iglesias and 5 times platinum single in the US "Let It Go" by James Bay.  He has won three Ivor Novello Awards and ASCAP PRS writer of the year 2000.  He has scored three US number-one singles, as well as other number-ones around the world.

His songs have been recorded by James Bay, Lionel Richie, James Morrison, Celine Dion, Ricky Martin, Lemar, Craig David, Tina Turner, Britney Spears, Rod Stewart, Lara Fabian, Ronan Keating, Esmee Denters, JLS, Rebecca Ferguson, the Vamps, Nelly Furtado, Beverley Knight, Mica Paris, Andrew Roachford, and Tom Walker (singer) among others.

Career
Barry was born in Edinburgh, Scotland where his band first signed with Bruce Findlay's Zoom Records as lead singer with the Questions while still at high school.  Whilst attending University, he went on to pursue his dream with his band, who were signed to Paul Weller's Respond record label.  He co-wrote "The House That Jack Built" for Tracie Young which reached number 9 on the UK charts in 1983.

In the 1990s, Barry was a member of the Eurodance reggae fusion group Dreamhouse, best known for their covers of "Stay" and "Sha La La". He then continued his songwriting career, writing for many artists, including five songs on the multi-platinum LP Believe by Cher, including "Strong Enough" and "Believe".  He also co-wrote the Cher songs "Song for the Lonely" and "The Music's No Good Without You" from the Living Proof album. Barry has also worked with Enrique Iglesias, initially writing for and later collaborating with him.  He has been a source of eight singles from four albums of Iglesias, including "Hero", "Bailamos" and "Be with You", the latter two songs reaching the number one spot on the Billboard Hot 100.  "Hero" stayed at number three in the US for four weeks, and was number one in the UK and several other countries.  Other hits include "Rhythm Divine", "Love to See You Cry" and "Not in Love" (featuring Kelis).

Barry worked with Lionel Richie for his Renaissance album, co-writing six songs, including the singles "Angel", "Don't Stop the Music" and "Tender Heart", then on five songs for Richie's Just for You album, including the title track, which Richie re-recorded on his No. 1 US album Tuskegee.

Barry co-wrote the Bryan McFadden/Delta Goodrem duet "Almost Here", which first brought the two artists together, and was number one in Ireland and Australia, as well as number three in the UK.  Barry worked with James Morrison on two songs for his Songs for You, Truths for Me album, including the first single "You Make It Real".  He also contributed two songs for JLS's debut album JLS and "Another World" for the Vamps' debut album, Meet the Vamps.  Barry co-wrote James Bay's single "Let It Go" and Nelly Furtado's song "Phoenix" (also co-written by Mark Taylor) for her sixth album The Ride.  In 2013 and 2017, he worked with Shane Filan of Irish boy band Westlife on four tracks from the albums You and Me and Love Always, which charted in the top 10 of both the UK and Irish albums charts.  

Barry also co-wrote "Cry Out" with Tom Walker for his UK number one album What a Time to Be Alive.  He co-wrote the single "Mama Said" from the Mica Paris album Gospel (Mica Paris album). Paris also covered Barry's song "In Broad Daylight", written after the murder of George Floyd.

Selected singles discography

Awards
ASCAP PRS, Writer of the year 2000
ASCAP PRS, Song of the year 1999 "Believe"
ASCAP PRS, Song of the year 2002 "Hero"
IVOR NOVELLO, Best Song musically/lyrically 1998 "Believe"
IVOR NOVELLO, Best Selling UK single 1998 "Believe"
IVOR NOVELLO, International Hit of the year 1998 "Believe"
Nominated – IVOR NOVELLO, International Hit of year 2001 "Hero"
Nominated – IVOR NOVELLO, Best Selling UK single 2002 "Hero"
Grammy Awards, Best Dance Recording 2000 "Believe"
Nominated, Best Dance Recording 2001 "Be with You"
Nominated, Best Dance Recording 2002 "Angel"

References

External links
 
 

Living people
British songwriters
Ivor Novello Award winners
Place of birth missing (living people)
Year of birth missing (living people)